John Neumann (1811–1860) was a Bohemian-American bishop.

John Neumann may also refer to:
St. John Neumann, Bryn Mawr, a Roman Catholic parish in the Archdiocese of Philadelphia
John von Neumann (1903–1957), Hungarian-American mathematician
Johnny Neumann (1950–2019), American basketball player and coach
John Robert Neumann Jr. (1972–2017), perpetrator of the Orlando factory shooting in 2017

See also
John Naumann (1893–1964), English cricketer
Saint John Neumann (disambiguation)
John Newman (disambiguation)